|}

The Kauto Star Novices' Chase is a Grade 1 National Hunt steeplechase in Great Britain which is open to horses aged four years or older. It is run at Kempton Park over a distance of about 3 miles (4,828 metres), and during its running there are eighteen fences to be jumped. The race is for novice chasers, and it is scheduled to take place each year during the King George VI Chase meeting on Boxing Day.  The race was originally known as the Feltham Novices' Chase.  The 2012 running additionally carried the name of Kauto Star (a winner of the King George VI Chase on five occasions) pending a permanent change of name. The permanent name change was confirmed by the BHA in July 2013.

Lizzie Kelly's victory on Tea For Two in the 2015 renewal made her the first female jockey to win a Grade One race in Britain.

Records
<div style="font-size:90%">
Leading jockey since 1975 (3 wins):
 Richard Dunwoody – Von Trappe (1985), Sparkling Flame (1990), Mutare (1991) 
 Mick Fitzgerald -  Fiddling the Facts (1997), Bacchanal (2000), Ungaro (2006)
 Tony McCoy -  Gloria Victis (1999), Maximize (2001), Darkness (2005) Leading trainer since 1975 (5 wins):
 Nicky Henderson – Sparkling Flame (1990), Mutare (1991), Fiddling the Facts (1997), Bacchanal (2000), Long Run (2009)  Paul Nicholls - See More Indians (1993), Strong Flow (2003), Breedsbreeze (2008), Black Corton (2017), Bravemansgame (2021) </div>

Winners since 1975

See also
 Horse racing in Great Britain
 List of British National Hunt races

References
Notes

Sources
 Racing Post:
, 
 pedigreequery.com – Feltham Novices' Chase – Kempton.''

External links
 Race Recordings 

National Hunt races in Great Britain
Kempton Park Racecourse
National Hunt chases